Eamon Kelly may refer to:

 Eamon M. Kelly (1936–2017), president of Tulane University, 1981–1998
 Eamon Kelly (criminal) (died 2012), Irish drug trafficker and crime leader
 Eamon Kelly (actor) (1914–2001), Irish actor and author
 Eamonn P. Kelly, Irish archaeologist